Ṣidqi Bin ʿAli Ismaʿil (1924 – 26 September 1972) was a Syrian scholar, writer, novelist, and playwright. He was born and educated in Antakya. He graduated from Dar Al-Muʿalimeen or "House of Scholars" in Damascus in 1948. He obtained a bachelor's degree in philosophy from Damascus University and a Diploma in Education in 1952. He taught in Damascus and Aleppo.

In 1968, he was appointed Secretary to The Supreme Council for Arts, Humanities and Social Sciences. He co-founded the Arab Writers Union and managed it until 1971. He was also the chief literary editor of Al-Mawqif Magazine. He was a member of the Story and Fiction Association.

Personal life 
He was one of four brothers, all of whom were scholars and artists. His four brothers are: Adham, Ṣidqi, ʿAziz, Naʿeem, their father is ʿAli Ismaʿil. His family is originally Arab from Sanjak of Alexandretta who immigrated from Sanjak after it was alienated from Syria in 1938. They had a huge influence on the literary and artistic revival that happened in Syria after independence.

Ṣidqi Ismaʿil finished his elementary school education at Al-ʿAffan School in Antakya before moving to Antakya Secondary School in 1936, the only Secondary School in his area at the time. After the Turks alienated Sanjak of Alexandretta in 1938, Ṣidqi and his brother, Adham, and a huge number of Arabs were forced to illegally cross the borders into Syria. After going to Syria, Ṣidqi and his brother – Adham – completed their secondary school education in schools in Hama, Aleppo, and finally, Damascus. He obtained his secondary school degree in 1943, and his Dar Al-Muʿalimeen or "House of Scholars" degree in 1945. He enrolled in the Syrian University in Damascus and obtained a bachelor's degree in philosophy and a Diploma 1952 before getting married in 1957.

Career 
Ṣidqi Ismaʿil worked in the field of teaching, switching between primary and secondary schools and the houses of teachers in Aleppo and Damascus until 1967. He was then appointed Secretary of The Supreme Council for Arts, Humanities, and Social Sciences in Damascus. He managed the Arab Writers Union from 1971, and was responsible for the magazine published by the Union, Al-Mawqif Al-Adabi Magazine. He participated in a number of international seminars, conferences, and Arabic Literary Festivals. He visited a number of European countries.

Ṣidqi Ismaʿil was a respected artist and a talented writer. He stayed true to his belief, which he lived for and wrote about. He started writing when he was in primary school; in addition to that, he was an excellent student with a sense of humor who enjoyed reading and studying. During his summer holidays, he used to edit small magazines using his pen before designing and giving them to his close friends. He improved his editing after his interest in journalism grew, for after moving from Sanjak to Syria, he founded Al-Majalla Al-Ṭullabiya or "Student Magazine" then Al-Majalla Al-Maghribiya or "The Moroccan Magazine"- which he founded during the 50s in celebration of the resistance of Western Arabia – finally, Majallat Al-Kalb or "The Dog Magazine" – a damascene magazine – which was a poetry magazine that he hand-wrote and distributed to friends and family with Suleiman Al-ʿIssa over the course of 20 years.

Arab Nationalism was the first Arab case that Ṣidqi Ismaʿil was interested in, and he continued to obsess over it throughout his life This obsession was started by the lectures he used to attend who were given by Zaki Al-Arsozi in The Arabism Club in Antakya. He, then, became part of the battle of fighting for the Arabism of Sanjak of Alexandretta, and he got his peers to participate in the national movement that was led by Al-Arsozi. He was shot by soldiers in one of the protests that took place in 1973, after which he was taken to the hospital and received clinical treatment for around two months. 
The Battle of Sanjak ended in the alienation of Sanjak from its native land which led to the immigration of Ṣidqi Ismaʿil from his small mother-land to a much bigger country (Syria). He continued fighting and resisting for the principles he adopted and for his native land and people. The Arabism he believed in was a part of his existence and character. Using his pen, he addressed all the things that are standing in the way of the progression of the Arab World, he also shared his thoughts on the many battles that the Arab World fought in the East and the West: from Sanjak to the Evacuation of the French Mandates to Palestine. The West Sahara revolutions, especially the Algerian revolution, the Suez Crisis, the Unity and Separation, and the 1963 Syrian coup d'état.

It wasn't the act of writing he was interested in, instead, he saw writing as a tool to address and fight political battles. To him, the only everlasting aspect to a nation is their culture – and culture is what unites them, not the policies of politics. He believed that the Arab Ba'ath Movement is the core that will lead to Pan-Arabism. He was one of the most active supporters of Pan-Arabism, for he was a member of the Founding Congress of the Ba'ath Party (April 1947). He kept resisting as a member of the Party for 15 years, and his loyalties remained with the party for his entire life. He contributed in editing Al-Ba'ath Weekly Newspaper until 1958 before moving to writing in the daily issues of Al-Jamaheer Newspaper. He passed away at the peak of his literary and intellectual career.

Intellectual influence
Ṣidqi Ismaʿil wrote articles, stories, novels, plays, and poetry. His bibliography was published in six volumes by the Ministry of Culture and National Guidance in Syria between 1977 and 1983. The unpublished manuscripts that were found after his death make up a bigger volume than his published work. Most of his writings revolves around the representation of the Arab reality and its surroundings, in addition to the national and humanitarian sides. His literary writings were influenced by the philosophy he deeply studied, for he believed that philosophy was a part of existence whereas literature was existence itself. He also believed that literature, its proceedings, and notable literary texts are what form nations, especially Arab nations.

Ṣidqi Ismaʿil believed that history isn't just a chronicling of events that once occurred and won't reoccur, instead, it's the presence of the past in the present and that can be noticed in the principles and views of the nation. This presence consists of the inherent nationalism from Pre-Abrahamic religions, the Islamic breakthroughs, and grief for the past, as a result of the age of regression. He writes about the Arab reality from his experiences, and stays true to the conclusions he comes to from his written thoughts, it includes: "Al-Yanabeeʿ" or "The Fountains" (1954), an article that was published in the Beirut Journal of Arts where he expresses his thoughts on the Arab definition of Freedom: "Ancient Arabs were wise in that they were free. They practiced their freedom without thinking or talking about it, unlike people today. They believed that freedom was an act and an experience, similar to a flowing fountain in the middle of a valley. Or similar to an eagle soaring in the heavens". In his book "Mohammad ʿAli Al-Qabisi: Founder of The Tunisian Movement" or "Mohammad ʿAli Al-Qabisi: Mu'asis Al-Ḥaraka Al-Tunisiya" (1955) he studies the starting point of Syndicalism in Tunisia, noting the importance of this movement succeeding, for he believed that it was the core of the future of Arab societies. His novel "Al-ʿAṣa" or "The Cane" talks about 3 or 4 successive generations in Syria from the days of the Ottomans to the French Mandates to the Syrian Independence from France. The same ideas progress in his philosophical study "Arabs and Misery" or "Al-ʿArab Wa Tajrobat Al-Ma'asa" (1963), and in his play "The Third Ember" or "Suqooṭ Al-Jamra Al-Thalitha" (1964), and in his short story collection "God and Poverty" or "Allahu Wa Al-Faqr" (1970), and in his manuscript "Al-Mutannabi's Experience" or "Tajrobat Al-Mutannabi" – which was published after his death.

Publications
Source
 Humane Incidents or "Mawaqif Insaniya" – Rambo – Van Gogh – Damascus – Alif Baa' Publications – 1978.
 Mohammad ʿAli Al-Qabisi: Founder of The Tunisian Movement  or "Mohammad ʿAli Al-Qabisi: Mu'asis Al-Ḥaraka Al-Tunisiya" – Damascus 1955. 
 Arabs and Misery or "Al-ʿArab Wa Tajrobat Al-Ma'asa" – Dar Al-Taliʿa: Beirut – 1963. 
 The Cane or "Al-ʿAṣa" – Novel – Beirut – Dar Al-Taliʿa – 1964.
 God and Poverty or "Allahu Wa Al-Faqr" – Arab Writers Union – Damascus 1970. 
 The Days of Solomon: ʿAmmar Searching for His Father or "Ayyam Solomon: ʿAmmar Yabḥath ʿAan Abeeh" – The Shoes or "Al-Aḥthiya" – The Third Ember or "Suqooṭ Al-Jamra Al-Thalitha" – Love of Al-Maraqash Al-Akbar or "Ḥob Al-Maraqash Al-Akbar" – The Accident or "Al-Ḥaditha" – Plays – Damascus – Alif Baa' Publications – 1981. 
 The Complete Works: Six volumes – National Command of The Arab Socialist Ba'ath Party – Damascus 1977. 
 The Storm or "Al-Iʿṣar" and other stories – Arabized Pushkin or "Pushkin Taʿrib" – Cairo – Dar Al-Ruwad – 1960.
 Opinions and Ideas on The Path to Pan-Arabism or "Araa' Wa 'Afkar ʿAla Ṭariq Al-Wiḥda Al-ʿArabiya" – Damascus – Arab Writers Union – 1971. 
 The Spirit of Forests or "Ruḥ Al-Ghabat" – Anton Chekhov – Revision and introductions – Al-Sharq Library – Aleppo – 1960.
 National Education Textbook – co-authored with Shafiq Al-Nuḥas and Majed Al-Thahabi – Damascus – Ministry of Education – 1959. 
 Arab Society or "Al-Mujtamaʿ Al-ʿArabi" – The Population – Health – Education – Co-authored with Antoine Raḥma – Damascus – Ministry of Education – 1975.

 As'ad al-Warak TV series, based on his novel (God and Poverty) or (Allahu Wa Al-Faqr) which was aired in 1975 and reproduced in 2010.

References 

1924 births
1972 deaths
People from Antakya
Syrian writers